Camp Yavneh is a residential Jewish summer camp in Northwood, New Hampshire. It was established in 1944 by the Boston Hebrew Teacher College under the leadership of Louis and Leah Hurwich, initially as a Hebrew study camp.

Yavneh is accredited by the American Camp Association. It offers children aged 8–16 a camp environment where Jewish values and activities are emphasized. The camp is not affiliated with one religious movement, considering itself K'lal Yisrael, and both egalitarian and Orthodox prayer services are offered daily.

References

External links
Official website

Yavneh
Yavneh
Buildings and structures in Rockingham County, New Hampshire
Northwood, New Hampshire